Dirty is the fourth studio album by gothic rock band One-Eyed Doll. It was released on 14 July 2012  and was the first one where the band went to an outside producer.
The album was produced at RadioStar Studios in Weed, CA and mastered in Sweden.

Track listing 
All songs written by Kimberly Freeman.

Personnel
Personnel list from oneeyedoll.com.
 Kimberly Freeman: vocals, guitar
 Junior: drums, bass, piano, organ

Additional personnel
 Ida Moody: opera vocals on track 1
 Mr. Swimmy Socks: banjo on track 5
 W. James Steck II: bass on tracks 1, 2, 7, 8 & 10

References 

2012 albums